Foveavirus is a genus of viruses in the order Tymovirales, in the family Betaflexiviridae. Plants serve as natural hosts. There are eight species in this genus. Diseases associated with this genus include: mosaic and ringspot symptoms.

Taxonomy
The following species are assigned to the genus:
Apple stem pitting virus
Apricot latent virus
Asian prunus virus 1
Asian prunus virus 2
Grapevine rupestris stem pitting-associated virus
Grapevine virus T
Peach chlorotic mottle virus
Rubus canadensis virus 1

Structure
Viruses in Foveavirus are non-enveloped, with flexuous and filamentous geometries. The diameter is around 12-13 nm. Genomes are linear, around 8.4-9.3kb in length. The genome codes for 5 proteins.

Life cycle
Viral replication is cytoplasmic, and is lysogenic. Entry into the host cell is achieved by penetration into the host cell. Replication follows the positive stranded RNA virus replication model. Positive stranded RNA virus transcription is the method of transcription. The virus exits the host cell by tripartite non-tubule guided viral movement. Plants serve as the natural host. Transmission routes are grafting.

References

External links
 Viralzone: Foveavirus
 ICTV

Betaflexiviridae
Virus genera